Alex Edwards (born 2 August 1975) was an English cricketer. He was a right-handed batsman and a right-arm medium-fast bowler who played for Sussex, Middlesex CB and Derbyshire between 1994 and 2001.

Edwards also had two Youth Test matches against India Under-19s, played his first match for Sussex, in the Second Eleven Championship in 1992, he played in his debut County Championship game in 1997, and was to appear for Sussex until 1999. He also played in one match for Middlesex. In 2001, he played for Derbyshire County Cricket Club. He now plays regular club cricket for Wisbrough Green CC in the Sussex county 3 division.

External links
Alex Edwards at Cricket Archive 

1975 births
Living people
English cricketers
Sussex cricketers
Derbyshire cricketers
British Universities cricketers
People from Cuckfield